The 1995–96 season was Sport Lisboa e Benfica's 92nd season in existence and the club's 62nd consecutive season in the top flight of Portuguese football, covering the period from 1 July 1995 to 30 June 1996. It involved Benfica competing in the Primeira Divisão and the Taça de Portugal. Benfica qualified for the UEFA Cup by coming third in previous League.

After failing to renew the title in the past season, the club brought in several players during the transfer market, with Ricardo Gomes, Valdo, Calado and Marcelo assuming regular starter roles. However, the club lost all of his more historic players as the case of Neno, Vítor Paneira, Isaías and César Brito. With the animosity around Artur Jorge increasing, poor results in September caused his departure. Despite an irregular season in the league, various winning streaks helped the team reach their second-place finish by 23 March, after a home win against Porto. In the Portuguese Cup, a strong performance from Marcelo throughout the competition, who finish as the tournament top scorer, guided the team to the final, where João Pinto delivered the trophy after scoring a double.

Season summary
The second season of Artur Jorge started with much more distrust over his abilities. From the large number of signings in the year before, only a handful prove noteworthy, and Tavares and Nelo even showed a complete inability to play for a big club. Despite that, more exits followed, with a 28-year-old Vítor Paneira, and the club league topscorer in the year before; Isaías, causing the most anger. Benfica signed mostly in Portugal, as with the league top goalscorer, Hassan, but also searched in Europe, bringing Valdo and Ricardo Gomes, back from France.

The league start was not ideal, as the team dropped four points in three match-days, leading to Artur Jorge being sacked after the build up of fan pressure. The club then selected Mário Wilson as his replacement. Benfica slowly started collecting wins over the following weeks, but after the defeat against FC Porto in the Clássico of 5 November, the distance to the league leader increased to eight points. In Europe, the ended their campaign, after being knock out by Bayern Munich, with Klinsmann scoring six goals, in what the press dubbed 'Cataklinsmann'.

In November, with Porto putting on a strong campaign, the club set eyes on closing the distance on the second place, occupied by Sporting. At the end of January, Benfica reach the second place for the first time, after João Pinto led the club past Vitória Guimarães. In the following month, a strong performance by Marcelo, allowed the club to progress through the Portuguese Cup semi-finals after beating Vitória de Guimarães. However, February did not go as well in the league race, with the club spending two weeks on the fourth place.

In March, Benfica received and beat Porto, with João Pinto scoring the winning goal, as he have done in Guimarães. With this win, the club re-assumed the second place, which would be its final league position, finishing the season six points ahead of Sporting, but an eleven behind Porto, which had the title wrapped up nearly a month before. In April, with only the Portuguese Cup to compete for. Marcelo continued his goalscoring record on the national cup, scoring a double in overtime for the semi-final against Leiria. On the 18 May, in the 1996 Taça de Portugal Final, João Pinto scored two against Sporting in a 3–1 win, with the club winning its twenty-third Taça de Portugal. The celebrations were nonetheless cancelled due to the death of a Sporting supporter, after being accidentally hit by a lost flare.

Competitions

Overall record

Primeira Divisão

League table

Results by round

Matches

Taça de Portugal

UEFA Cup

First round

Second round

Third round

Friendlies

Player statistics
The squad for the season consisted of the players listed in the tables below, as well as staff member Artur Jorge (manager), Zoran Filipovic (assistant manager) and Mário Wilson (manager).

|}

Transfers

In

In by loan

Out

Out by loan

References

Bibliography
 

S.L. Benfica seasons
Benfica